RAS model may refer to:

 Reliability, availability and serviceability, a computer hardware engineering term originally used by IBM
 John Zaller's "Receive-Accept-Sample" model, propounded in his book The Nature and Origins of Mass Opinion